Allan Amato; (born July 18, 1974) is an American portrait photographer and film director.

Career

In 2005, Amato was working in advertising in New Orleans, but changed his career path after Hurricane Katrina forced him to relocate.  Amato was evacuated to Houston, where he bought his lighting and camera equipment.

Seven years later, he began the creation of Temple of Art, which originally was planned to be a small gallery show, but became a published book project due to the show's initial popularity. Soon after, Amato, with oft collaborator and filmmaker Olga Nunes, developed Temple of Art into a feature-length a documentary. The documentary profiles Grant Morrison, Bill Sienkiewicz, Brian Thies, Barron Storey, Amanda Palmer, Neil Gaiman, David Mack, Dave McKean and others, each sharing their stories of their creations, influences and philosophies.

Most recently Amato published his photography series titled “Slip” (with Baby Tattoo Books, 2016) in which he photographed sixty nude models, interviewing each, and exploring the idea of nudity and the culture of shame in society.

Film credits

 Temple of Art (2016) co-creator (with Olga Nunes)
 The Death of "Superman Lives": What Happened? (2015) -supervising producer

Book credits

 S L I P: Naked In Your Own Words - photographer/author  (Baby Tattoo Books, 2016)
Temple of Art - photographer/author  ( Baby Tattoo Books, 2014)

Recognition

In 2016, Allan Amato was nominated for an APN 2016 AltPorn Awards for Best Alternative Erotica Photographer of 2015.

References

Further reading

External links
 

1972 births
Living people
Photographers from Texas
Photographers from Louisiana
San Francisco Art Institute alumni
Artists from Houston
Artists from New Orleans
Film directors from Texas